The 25th series of The Bill, a British television drama, was the penultimate series of the programme. This series saw the show transition to a post-watershed time slot of 9pm, dropping from two episodes to one week-by-week as ITV aimed to save up to £65 million. Producers used the post-watershed slot to introduce "darker, more gritty" storylines. DI Samantha Nixon left prior to the transition, after seven years on the show, in a special two-parter storyline that included a cameo appearance by her daughter Abigail (Georgia Tennant), who was a recurring character on the show from 2002 to 2005. A six-part storyline came as part of the end of the twice-weekly episodes, Conviction, that concluded with four cast members leaving, including Superintendent John Heaton; DCI Jack Meadows was promoted into the role. The four characters were part of seven who left as part of the revamp, however the axing of Graham Cole as PC Tony Stamp after 22 years on the show proved controversial, with producers stating Cole was "too old" for the new-look show. In addition to seeing ten characters leave the show, it is the only series in the show's history not to have a new arrival.

On 30 April 2014, The Bill Series 25 Part 1-3 DVD set was released (in Australia).

Cast changes

Arrivals
 None

Departures
 PC Beth Green - transfers to Witness Protection
 PC Arun Ghir - resigns after suspension for allowing suspect to escape
 DI Samantha Nixon - transfers to the Child Protection Team
 Supt John Heaton - leaves to head up specialist group combating human trafficking
 Insp Rachel Weston - joins Supt. Heaton's new division
 DS Stuart Turner - joins Supt. Heaton's new division
 DC Kezia Walker - joins Supt. Heaton's new division
 PC Tony Stamp - transfers to Hendon to become Advanced Driving Instructor
 PC Sally Armstrong - unconfirmed
 PC Millie Brown - unconfirmed

Episodes

References

2009 British television seasons
The Bill series